Élisabeth François Armide Durey de Morsan, countess of Rochechouart (1757–1805), daughter of a notable writer, was a French noblewoman involved in continued underground counter-revolutionary resistance to the French Revolution. These included an attempt to arrange the escape of her friend Marie-Antoinette.

In 1775 she married count Jules de Rochechouart and they had two sons (Louis and Louis-Victor-Léon) and a daughter.

French countesses
French counter-revolutionaries
1757 births
1805 deaths
Elisabeth